Dipika Chikhlia Topiwala is an Indian actress and politician known for playing Devi Sita in Ramanand Sagar's television series Ramayan and for acting in other Indian TV serials. She was also known for her debut film Sun Meri Laila (1983), opposite Raj Kiran and three Hindi films with Rajesh Khanna, which were Rupaye Dus Karod, Ghar Ka Chiraag and Khudai.

She did one Malayalam film Ithile Iniyum Varu (1986), with Mammootty, her Kannada hits were Hosa Jeevana (1990) with Shankar Nag and Indrajith (1989) with Ambareesh. She had one Tamil hit film, Nangal (1992), with Prabhu, and one Bengali hit film, Asha O Bhalobasha (1989), opposite Prosenjit Chatterjee.

Career

Early career
Chikhlia made her debut as lead actress in Sun Meri Laila (1983), opposite Raj Kiran. Bollywood was part of the television serial Dada Daadi Ki Kahani in 1985. She meanwhile did supporting roles in hit films like Bhagwan Dada (1986), Kala Dhanda Goray Log (1986) and Doorie (1989) and played lead heroine in the horror  film Cheekh (1986) and Raat Ke Andhere Mein (1987).

Success (1987-95)
Later in 1987, Chikhlia played the female lead role of Sita in Ramanand Sagar's television series Ramayan. Before starring in Ramayan, she was the part of Ramanand Sagar's Vikram Aur Betaal. She continued getting lead roles in hit TV serials like The Sword of Tipu Sultan and Luv Kush (both in 1989). Her only hits in Hindi films were Ghar Ka Chiraag (1989) and Rupaye Dus Karod (1991), both of which had Rajesh Khanna in the lead. She got more footage in the film Khudai, but the film was a commercial failure in 1994. She played the romantic lead of Rajesh Khanna in two films, Ghar Ka Chiraag and Khudai. Her Kannada film as the lead heroine opposite Shankar Nag was a box office hit in 1990 and her Bengali films Asha O Bhalobasha (1989), opposite Prosenjit Chatterjee and Tamil film Naangal (1992) opposite Prabhu were box office hits. She also got a supporting role in a Malayalam movie, Ithile Iniyum Varu (1986), which had Mammootty in the lead. She met with limited success in Hindi films after 1992, as Sanam Aap Ki Khatir (1992) flopped, which had her as main lead heroine, she only got supporting roles in Hindi films.

Later career
Chikhlia was also seen in the TV serial Chutta Chheda (2017) on Colors Gujarati channel. The Gujarati film Nattsamrat is to be released in August 2018 and she will be seen in her upcoming Hindi movie Gaalib (2018-2019). Dipika Chikhlia is working again.

She was last seen in the movie Bala (November 2019) as Pari's (Yami Gautam) mother. In the upcoming biopic of freedom fighter - Sarojini Naidu, she will be seen playing the role of her.

Politics
Dipika Chikhlia Topiwala followed up her television and film career with a move into politics, becoming a Member of Parliament in the Indian Lok Sabha from Baroda constituency in 1991 as a Bharatiya Janata Party candidate.

Personal life

On 23 November 1991, Dipika married Hemant Topiwala, owner of Shingar Bindi and Tips and Toes cosmetics. They have two daughters, Nidhi Topiwala and Juhi Topiwala.

Filmography

References

External links
Official biographical sketch in Parliament of India website
 
 
 

Living people
Gujarati people
Actresses from Mumbai
Indian film actresses
Actresses in Kannada cinema
Actresses in Hindi cinema
Indian television actresses
India MPs 1991–1996
Politicians from Mumbai
Women in Gujarat politics
Lok Sabha members from Gujarat
20th-century Indian women politicians
20th-century Indian politicians
20th-century Indian actresses
Bharatiya Janata Party politicians from Gujarat
Actresses in Malayalam cinema
Actresses in Tamil cinema
Actresses in Bengali cinema
Actresses in Gujarati cinema
Actresses in Telugu cinema
Actresses in Bhojpuri cinema
Women members of the Lok Sabha
Year of birth missing (living people)